Euryparyphes is a genus of grasshoppers in the family Pamphagidae. There are about 17 described species in Euryparyphes, found in southern Europe and North Africa.

Species
These 17 species belong to the genus Euryparyphes:

 Euryparyphes atlasicus La Greca, 1993
 Euryparyphes bolivarii (Stål, 1876)
 Euryparyphes breviphallus La Greca, 1993
 Euryparyphes cinerascens La Greca, 1993
 Euryparyphes defauti La Greca, 1993
 Euryparyphes flexuosus Uvarov, 1927
 Euryparyphes gharbensis Defaut, 1987
 Euryparyphes laetus (Bolívar, 1907)
 Euryparyphes mamorensis Defaut, 1987
 Euryparyphes maroccanus (Saussure, 1887)
 Euryparyphes nigripes La Greca, 1993
 Euryparyphes paraflexuosus La Greca, 1993
 Euryparyphes pictipes Uvarov, 1927
 Euryparyphes rungsi Massa, 2013
 Euryparyphes sitifensis (Brisout de Barneville, 1854)
 Euryparyphes tazzekensis La Greca, 1993
 Euryparyphes terrulentus (Serville, 1838)

References

Pamphagidae
Caelifera